Mark Daigneault (pronounced DAYG-nolt; born February 23, 1985) is an American professional basketball coach and head coach for the Oklahoma City Thunder of the National Basketball Association (NBA).

Coaching career
Daigneault began his coaching career as a student manager at UConn from 2003 to 2007 under Jim Calhoun. After earning his bachelor's degree in education, Daigneault initially intended to go for a master's degree, but was urged by Calhoun and associate head coach George Blaney to pursue an assistant coaching role at Holy Cross and offered strong recommendations. 

Daigneault was an assistant coach of the Florida Gators from 2010 to 2014 and was head coach of the NBA G League's Oklahoma City Blue, which is affiliated with the Oklahoma City Thunder of the NBA, from 2014 to 2019. During the 2019–20 NBA season, Daigneault joined the Thunder as an assistant, reuniting him with head coach Billy Donovan, who was the Gators' coach, while Daigneault served as an assistant. On November 11, 2020, the Thunder promoted Daigneault to head coach.

Head coaching record

|- 
| style="text-align:left;"|Oklahoma City
| style="text-align:left;"|
| 72||22||50|||| style="text-align:center;"|5th in Northwest||—||—||—||—
| style="text-align:center;"|Missed playoffs
|- 
| style="text-align:left;"|Oklahoma City
| style="text-align:left;"|
| 82||24||58|||| style="text-align:center;"|5th in Northwest||—||—||—||—
| style="text-align:center;"|Missed playoffs
|- class="sortbottom"
| style="text-align:center;" colspan="2"|Career
| 154||46||108|||| ||—||—||—||—||

Personal life
Daigneault's father, Rick, is a 1980 graduate of the College of the Holy Cross, and was a member of the Crusader baseball team.

References

External links
 Holy Cross Crusaders bio
 Profile on basketball-reference.com

1985 births
Living people
American men's basketball coaches
Basketball coaches from Massachusetts
Florida Gators men's basketball coaches
Holy Cross Crusaders men's basketball coaches
Oklahoma City Blue coaches
Oklahoma City Thunder assistant coaches
Oklahoma City Thunder head coaches
People from Leominster, Massachusetts
Sportspeople from Worcester County, Massachusetts
UConn Huskies men's basketball coaches